The CS/LS06 or CF-05, also known as Changfeng submachine gun, is submachine gun developed by Chongqing Chang Feng Co. Ltd in early 1990s in response to China's demand for a new submachine gun design. 

It was developed by the same team who designed the QSZ-92 pistol, which is now the primary pistol used by PLA and PAP. CF-05 design is chambered for 9×19mm Parabellum ammunition, used internationally for most pistols and sub machine guns used by armed forces and law enforcement.

Development
The CF-05 was designed by Qing Shangsheng, a senior designer of Chongqing ChangFeng Corporation, who also designed the QSZ-92 pistol. According to the designer, the CF-05 was his private project initiated between 1993 and 1994, and was not brought to the attention of his factory manager until 1996. Early prototypes were built to compete in People's Liberation Army's 5.8mm suppressed submachine gun project. The first prototypes had a secondary feed option, with a pistol magazine inserted into the pistol grip in addition to the distinctive helical magazine inserted at the feed-port located at the rear of the weapon, which makes the magazine works like a dual-purpose gunstock. Once the primary magazine had been exhausted, the shooter could switch to the secondary magazine to sustain firing. The rear-feed design was changed during the testing due to the inconvenience in ergonomics, also the firearms expert felt the feed-hole at the gun rear aesthetically unpleasing. Eventually, Changfeng's bid lost to Jianshe corporation's QCW-05 proposal in 2001.

After losing to QCW-05, Changfeng decided export sales were to be a priority, and they needed to make a 9mm version, later named QC-9. Development team made several other improvement to improve the designs ergonomics and reliability. The second prototype moved the helical cylinder to the top, and it features a new telescoping stock. The third prototype made improvement to the stock. Upon testing, the secondary feed option was abandoned due to the possibility of introducing malfunctions caused by human error during field operations. In March 2004, the final prototype, which dropped the secondary feed function, went through a review before the design was finalized in May 2005. The finalized prototype received internal designation CF-05. Export effort was made in 2006, which gives the production designation CS/LS06, the current name marketed by Norinco.

Design 
The CF05 submachine gun is a blowback-operated weapon chambered for the 9 × 19 mm cartridge. It fires from a closed bolt of a telescoped design, which wraps around the barrel. The weapon feeds ammunition from a 50-round helical magazine located at the top of the polymer receiver. It is fitted with a collapsible stock and the barrel is threaded to accept a suppressor. Other accessories may include laser pointer, tactical flashlight, and daylight optics.

The latest model of the CS/LS06 features modified polymer furniture, a front pistol grip with a different grip angle, a modified trigger guard, a different stock design, and pictographic selector markings. Although it is externally similar to Calico M950, the feed system features a entirely new design due to CS/LS06's rear-feed design lineage. The cylinder magazine contains a helical glide grooves at its inner walls. When the glide rotate by the central axis, the cartridges follows the helical track inside the cylinder. This design allows the gun to store 50 rounds of ammunition in relatively compact package.

Variants
Changfeng submachine gun Early prototype chambered in 5.8×21mm ammo. 
QC-9 Early 9×19mm Parabellum prototypes.
CF-05 Finalized 9×19mm Parabellum prototype. 
CS/LS06 Export designation by Norinco.

Users

 : People's Police of the People's Republic of China, People's Armed Police
 : 100,000 unit.
 : Uganda National Police
 : Venezuelan Army In service with the 509 Special Forces Battalion of the Army, Presidential Honor Guard, and the Special Unit for Security and Protection of State Personalities (UESPPE).

See also
 CS/LS5
 CS/LS7

References

Weapons of the People's Republic of China
9mm Parabellum submachine guns